

Squad for 2009

Current squad
The squad for the 2009 season:

Player Changes

In

Out

Table

Fixtures

Week 1

Week 2

Week 3
 No D/L Savings in Brisbane

Week 4

Week 5
 No D/L Savings in Brisbane

Week 6

! align=centre colspan=100| Bye
|- bgcolor="#FFFFFF"
|  Reds
|  Stormers

Week 7
 No D/L Savings in Brisbane, Sunday 29 March D/L Savings ends in Perth.

Week 8
 Sunday, 5 April D/L Savings Ends in Australia and New Zealand.

Week 9
 Easter Weekend

Week 10

Week 11

Week 12

Week 13

Week 14

Statistics

Leading Try Scorers

Top 5

Leading Points Scorers
Top 5

References

External links
 Official site of the Queensland Reds
 Official site of the QRU

2009
2009 in Australian rugby union
2009 Super 14 season by team